Ceptura Coal Mine is an open-pit mining exploitation it is considered one of the largest in the country of Romania located in Ceptura, Prahova County with estimated coal reserves of 18 million tonnes. 

The coal mine opened in 1954. The legal entity managing the Câmpulung mine is the Ploieşti National Coal Company, which was set up in 1957.

References

Coal mines in Romania
1954 establishments in Romania